The Bornite Range is a subrange of the Bulkley Ranges, located just northeast of Terrace on the north side of Kleanza Creek in northern British Columbia, Canada.

Mountains
Bornite Mountain

See also
Bornite

References

Bornite Range in the Canadian Mountain Encyclopedia

Hazelton Mountains